Turkey on the Table is a company created by Kerry Maunus and April George. Started in 2015, the company sells a kit that comes with a knit turkey, a marker, 13 feathers and a storybook and is intended to help people to think about what they are grateful for before Thanksgiving. They started the company in 2015 to try to teach their children about gratitude. Turkey on the Table has teamed up with the hunger relief organization Feeding America and donates $1 to Feeding America with the sale of each kit. As of November 2018, the company had donated more than 1,000,000 meals. Turkey on the Table is sold online and in more than 1500 retailer stores.

References 

2015 establishments in the United States